Adhagappattathu Magajanangalay is a 2017 Indian Tamil-language comedy thriller film written and directed by Inbasekhar. The film stars newcomers Umapathy Ramaiah and Reshma Rathore, while Karunakaran and Pandiarajan play supporting roles. Featuring music composed by D. Imman, the film began production in early 2015.

Cast

Umapathy Ramaiah as Anand
Reshma Rathore as Shruthi
Karunakaran
Pandiarajan as Anand's father
Anjali Devi as Anand's mother
Yog Japee as Janaki Raman
Manobala
Aadukalam Naren
Yuvina Parthavi
Rajee
Harish
Pollachi Raja
Rekha Suresh

Production
In late 2014, Thambi Ramaiah announced plans to introduce his son Umapathy Ramaiah as a leading actor, and  helped find his son a chance to act in the film, Adhagappattathu Magajanangalay, directed by Inbasekhar and produced by Rameshkumar. Reshma Rathore, who had appeared in Malayalam films, signed on to play the lead female role and scenes were subsequently shot in and around Chennai during the middle of 2015. D. Imman was signed on to compose the film's music, while an ensemble cast of Karunakaran, Pandiarajan and Aadukalam Naren were added to play supporting roles. By August 2015, the film was revealed to be close to completion and awaiting a release date.

Soundtrack
D. Imman has scored the original score and soundtrack for the film. Sony Music has acquired the audio rights. There are seven tracks in the album including two instrumentals. The film's soundtrack and trailer launched on 7 October.

Reception 
A critic from The Times of India wrote that "Director Inbasekar has fallen short of the minimum and ended up dishing out a bland fare".

References

External links
 

2017 films
2010s Tamil-language films
Indian comedy thriller films
Films scored by D. Imman
2017 directorial debut films